Black Label Series is a feature phone series created by LG Electronics.
Currently, there are 4 released versions:
 LG Chocolate (KG800) (International version) - May 2006LG Chocolate (VX8500) (US Version) - July, 2006
LG Chocolate Platinum (KE800)  - October, 2006
 LG Shine KE970 - January, 2007
 LG Secret - May 3, 2008
 New Chocolate BL40 - 2009New Chocolate BL20 - October, 2009

References

External links 
 LG Electronics Global Website
 LG Electronics Korea Website
 LG Mobile Website
 "Life's Good When..." LG Video Contest
 LG Video Contest YouTube Channel

Black Label Series